Dunkle Run is a  long 2nd order tributary to Brush Run in Washington County, Pennsylvania, United States.

Variant names
According to the Geographic Names Information System, it has also been known historically as:
Dunkie Run

Course
Dunkle Run rises about 1 mile northwest of Buffalo, Pennsylvania, in Washington County and then flows southwest to join Brush Run about 0.5 miles northeast of Acheson.

Watershed
Dunkle Run drains  of area, receives about 40.0 in/year of precipitation, has a wetness index of 318.15, and is about 45% forested.

See also
List of Pennsylvania Rivers

References

Rivers of Pennsylvania
Rivers of Washington County, Pennsylvania